Plévenon is a commune in the Côtes-d'Armor department of Brittany in northwestern France.

On January 1, 1973, Plévenon was merged with the commune of Pléherel, after which the new commune was called Fréhel. However, Plévenon was re-established as a separate commune in October 2004.

Population

Inhabitants of Plévenon are called Plévennais in French.

See also
 Communes of the Côtes-d'Armor department
 Cap Fréhel

References

Communes of Côtes-d'Armor